The Animal Rights National Conference is an annual conference in the United States. Started in 1981 under a different name, since 2000 it has been organized by Farm Animal Rights Movement (FARM).

History
In the 1970s, Alex Hershaft started noticing that animal rights people were attending his vegetarian conferences. After discussing with them and doing more reading on the subject, in 1981 he organized Action for Life, a joining of the vegetarian and animal rights movements, and launched a series of annual conferences. These conferences were held annually for seven years (1981–1987) and typically included training sessions for activists, networking, ceremonial activities, video showings, and open discussions. The conferences helped spawn other animal rights organizations with different focuses, including Farm Animal Rights Movement (Hershaft's organization), People for the Ethical Treatment of Animals, Trans-Species Unlimited, Mobilization for Animals, and Animal Rights Network.

Peter Linck of the National Alliance for Animals had also been holding conferences in the 1980s, and those became the successors to the Action for Life conferences from 1988 to 1996.

In 1997, FARM stepped up to again organize the national conferences, alternating between east and west coast venues.

In 2004, after the prosecution of a few animal rights activists as terrorists, the Humane Society of the United States and a few other animal protection groups withdrew their support for these conferences as they didn't want to advocate for violence. Those organizations formed their own annual conferences under the name "Taking Action for Animals". Likewise, Direct Action Everywhere hosts the Animal Liberation Conference.

In 2018, Alex Hershaft retired as Conference Chair.  Jen Riley took on the post of Conference Chair and organizes the conferences along with Ethan Eldreth as Program Manager and a newly formed Program Advisory Committee.

Conferences
, a typical conference involves "2,000 attendees representing 90 organizations from a dozen countries, with 100 exhibitors and 170 speakers presenting in 80 sessions."

Animal Rights Hall of Fame
Elected by the speakers of each annual conference, individuals who have made outstanding contributions towards animal rights in the US are inducted into the U.S. Animal Rights Hall of Fame. Previous winners include:

 2000: Cleveland Amory, Howard Lyman, Ingrid Newkirk, Peter Singer, Henry Spira
 2001: Gene Baur, Lorri Houston, Alex Hershaft, Jim Mason, Alex Pacheco
 2002: Karen Davis, Shirley McGreal, Paul Watson
 2003: Rodney Coronado, Elliot Katz
 2004: Bruce Friedrich, Laura Moretti
 2005: Matt Ball, Jack Norris, Gretchen Wyler
 2006: Steve Hindi, Ben White
 2007: Kevin Kjonaas, James Laveck, Jenny Stein
 2008: Paul Shapiro
 2009: Nathan Runkle
 2010: Zoe Weil
 2011: Carol J. Adams
 2012: Joe Connelly and Colleen Holland
 2013: Erica Meier
 2014: Jon Camp
 2015: Josh Balk
 2016: Tom Regan

References

External links
 

Recurring events established in 2000
Animal welfare organizations based in the United States
Animal rights movement